The Wire Fox Terrier (also known as Wire Hair Fox Terrier or Wirehaired Terrier) is a breed of dog, one of many terrier breeds. It is a fox terrier, and although it bears a resemblance to the Smooth Fox Terrier, they are believed to have been developed separately.

Appearance

Its rough, broken coat is distinctive. Coat color consists of a predominant white base with brown markings of the face and ears, and usually a black saddle or large splotch of color; there may be other black or brown markings on the body.

Temperament
Two of the Wire Fox Terrier's most distinctive traits are its energy and intelligence. It has a low threshold for boredom and requires stimulation, exercise and attention. The Wire Fox Terrier is a companion animal that requires near-constant attention. 

The dog should be alert, quick and ready to respond swiftly with enthusiasm. However, they should also be friendly, communicative, and playful if they receive the proper care and exercise. Bred to be independent thinkers, they are capable of tactical maneuvering for vermin and other sport.

Often, Wire Fox Terriers are abandoned or surrendered for reasons that may include: running away instead of coming on a command; chasing cars, bicycles, other dogs, etc.; or taunting and then attacking other animals, including a household's cats and other dogs –and they are able to do serious damage. But these are actually normal behaviors for a breed designed to hunt not only foxes, but also badgers and boars, with no more fear of cows or buses than they have of small prey. Keeping one as a pet requires firm control to redirect these prey instincts and provide the dog with enough exercise and diversion. With diligent supervision, Wire Fox Terriers can be amusing, exciting, long-lived companion animals.

Grooming

Wire Fox Terriers kept for show are hand stripped; if the hair becomes too long, it is taken out by hand in order to preserve the colors and the glossiness of the coat.  Many kept as pets are clipped monthly by a groomer.  Clipping dulls the colors and makes the coat soft, curly and more difficult to keep clean, but it is preferred by many owners due to being a simpler (and cheaper) procedure than stripping.

History
The Wire Fox Terrier was developed in England by fox hunting enthusiasts and is believed to be descended from a now-extinct rough-coated, black-and-tan working terrier of Wales, Derbyshire, and Durham. The breed was also thought to have been bred to chase foxes into their burrows; the dogs' short, strong, usually docked tails were used as handles by the hunter to pull them back out.

Although it is said Queen Victoria owned one, and her son and heir, King Edward VII, did own a Wire Fox Terrier named Caesar, the breed was not popular as a family pet until the 1930s, when The Thin Man series of feature films was created.  Asta, the canine member of the Charles family, was a Wire Fox Terrier, and the popularity of the breed soared. Milou (Snowy) from The Adventures of Tintin comic strip is also a Wire Fox Terrier.

In the late 20th century, the popularity of the breed declined again, most likely due to changing living conditions in the Western world and the difficulty of keeping hunting terriers in cities due to their strong prey instincts.

As of 2019, the Wire Fox Terrier has the distinction of having received more Best in Show titles at Westminster Kennel Club dog shows (currently 15) than any other breed. Matford Vic, a Wire Fox Terrier, is one of only five dogs to have won the Westminster Kennel Club Dog Show on more than one occasion. She won the competition twice, in 1915 and 1916. The only dog to win it on more occasions was Warren Remedy, a smooth fox terrier, who won it on three occasions between 1907 and 1909.

Noteworthy wire fox terriers

Archie, owned by Gill Raddings Stunt Dogs, starred in ITV's Catwalk Dogs.
Asta, from The Thin Man film series
Beauty, awarded the Dickin Medal for conspicuous gallantry or devotion to duty while serving in military conflict.
Bob, from the Hercule Poirot episode Dumb Witness
Bunny, from the film Hudson Hawk
Bella, who played Snoopy in the movie Moonrise Kingdom
Boer, the dog of Alexei Brusilov, the author of the 'Brusilov Offensive'.
Caesar, the companion of King Edward VII of the United Kingdom
Charles, brought to Ceylon by Leonard Woolf in 1905
Chester, in the 1998 film Jack Frost
Dášeňka, the dog of Czechoslovak writer and journalist Karel Čapek - also featured as the hero of his book Dášeňka čili život štěněte
Dodger Herbie Tobacco (only a mutt in the film) from the Disney animated film Oliver & Company is actually a Wire Fox Terrier.
Dogmatix (French: Idéfix), companion of Asterix and Obelix.
Featherstonehaugh (pronounced 'Foon'), "a wire-haired fox terrier of irreproachable breeding" from Margery Allingham's novel Police at the Funeral.
Guido from the film Pups United
Ike Larue, from the Ike Larue series, written and illustrated by Mark Teague
J.D. from the film Millionaire Dogs (1999)
Jani, owned by Vincent Korda, mentioned by his son Michael Korda in "Alone" (2017)
Lacey, Ch. Registry’s Lonesome Dove, 1992 Best in Show winner at Westminster Dog Show
Mickey, the companion of French composer Francis Poulenc.
Moll, from the book Memoirs of a Fox-Hunting Man
Montmorency, from the book Three Men in a Boat by Jerome K. Jerome
Pan, the companion of A.L. Westgard, AAA pathfinder. Pan was the mascot of the dedication tour for the National Park to Park Highway in 1920.
Pard, the companion of Humphrey Bogart character in the 1941 film High Sierra. Pard was played by Humphrey Bogart's own dog, Zero.  It is evident in the film that Pard loves his master.
Polly, a white rough terrier companion to Charles Darwin
Scruffy, the Muirs' wire fox terrier on The Ghost and Mrs. Muir television series
Skippy, canine actor in the 1930s
Asta, from the film adaptation of The Thin Man (the novel's breed was a Schnauzer)
George, from Bringing Up Baby 
Mr. Atlas, from Topper Takes a Trip 
Mr. Smith, from The Awful Truth 
Sky, winner of the 2012 Purina Thanksgiving Dog Show and the 2014 Westminster Dog Show.
Snowy (French: Milou), companion of Tintin
Topsy, the dog of actress Diana Napier while married to tenor Richard Tauber.
Van Gogh, Paul Meltsner's dog featured in his famous painting Paul, Marcella and Van Gogh
Vicki, Rudyard Kipling's dog
Watch, the pet and companion of The Boxcar Children, is a Wire Fox Terrier.
Wessex, the dog of British novelist (Tess of the d'Urbervilles) Thomas Hardy
Willy, from the film Ask the Dust
Wuffles, the Patrician's dog in the Discworld Series

See also
 Dogs portal
 List of dog breeds
Fox Terrier, for additional details on history, genetics, coat color, etc.

References

External links

 

Dog breeds originating in England
FCI breeds
Terriers